Granigyra radiata is a species of sea snail, a marine gastropod mollusk, unassigned in the superfamily Seguenzioidea.

Description
The shell grows to a height of 2.5 mm.

Distribution
This species occurs in the Atlantic Ocean off Georgia, found at a depth of 538 m.

References

External links
 To Biodiversity Heritage Library (2 publications)
 To Encyclopedia of Life
 To USNM Invertebrate Zoology Mollusca Collection
 To World Register of Marine Species

radiata
Gastropods described in 1927